Alveolinidae is a family of spheroidal to fusiform milioline foraminifera with multiple apertures and complex interiors in which chambers are subdivided into chamberlets and subfloors interconnected by passageways. As with all Miliolina, the test wall in alveolinids is porcellaneous and imperforate. In living individuals the pseudopodia emerge through the multiple apertures that line the apertural or leading face of the test.

Alveolinids first appeared near the beginning of the Late Cretaceous, about 100 million years ago, some 150 million years after the superficially similar fusulinids became extinct at the end of the Permian.

Irregular coiling is found in the first volutions in the microspheric forms of most genera, indicating a close relationship with the Miliolidae. Alveolinella is an exception as the proloculus in the microspheric form is perforate and the first volutions are peneroplid in character, suggesting it, Alveolinella, may have a different origin than the other alveolinids.

References

Alfred R. Loeblich Jr and Helen Tappan, 1964, Treatise on Invertebrate Paleontology, Part C, Protista 2; Geological Society of America and University of Kansas Press.

Tubothalamea
Foraminifera families